Since 1974, the University of Virginia’s Z Society has presented Edgar F. Shannon Awards to the "best" graduating students from each of the university’s schools.

In the notification letter to the winners each year, the Z Society writes, "The definition of best student is intentionally left ambiguous because each of us pursues greatness in very different ways; however, the best student is an individual who has pursued academic greatness with fervent ardor and keen insight while never forgetting the importance of those priorities aside from school." Winners are determined based upon the recommendations of deans and students.

The awards are named for the University of Virginia’s fourth president Edgar F. Shannon.

Recent Winners

Notes

Sources 
http://www.virginia.edu/uvatoday/newsRelease.php?id=5163
http://www.med-ed.virginia.edu/handbook/awards/shannonz.cfm

University of Virginia
1974 establishments in Virginia